The Dirty Rotten Power  is a split EP with three songs by the American crossover thrash band D.R.I. and two songs by Italian hardcore punk band Raw Power, and was released in 2001. It was released exclusively on 7" vinyl by Killer Release Records. It was reissued in 2012 on 2x Flexi-disc, 7", 33 ⅓ RPM single-sided vinyl under F.O.A.D. Records containing a bonus track.

Track listing

Songs 1-3 are taken from D.R.I.'s 1995 Full Speed Ahead album.  Songs 4 and 5 are taken from Raw Power's 2000 album, Trust Me!.

Personnel
Band
 Kurt Brecht – vocals
 Spike Cassidy – guitars
 Chumly Porter – bass
 Rob Rampy – drums

Miscellaneous staff
TERMINALaRt - artwork

D.R.I. (band) albums
2001 EPs